The Mercenary may refer to:

 The Mercenary (film), a 1968 film directed by Sergio Corbucci
 The Mercenary, a 2019 American film starring Dominique Vandenberg
 A novel by Jerry Pournelle, included in The Prince omnibus
 Luc Poirier, a professional wrestler who wrestled as The Mercenary
 Ron Fuller (wrestler), a professional wrestler who wrestled as The Mercenary
 El Mercenario, also known as The Mercenary, a Spanish comic series

See also 
Mercenary (disambiguation)